The Kampala–Jinja Highway is a road in Uganda, connecting the cities of Kampala and Jinja. Sometimes referred to as Kampala–Jinja Road, it is a busy road, with several towns, trading centers and other points of interest along the way. As of October 2016, a new, wider, four-lane dual carriageway expressway, the Kampala–Jinja Expressway, is proposed to be constructed south of the present highway to relieve traffic and complement existing transport infrastructure between Kampala and Jinja.

Location
 The coodinates of this highway near the town of Lugazi are:0°22'27.0"N, 32°54'56.0"E (Latitude:0.374175; Longitude:32.915550).

Overview
The highway is an all-weather tarmac single carriageway road in good condition. The highway forms a section of the Northern Corridor, a road system that connects the East African cities of Bujumbura, in Burundi, Kigali, in Rwanda and Kampala, in Uganda to Nairobi, in Kenya and ultimately to the Kenyan port of Mombasa. The road is a vital commercial link to the outside world for the three land-locked countries. It is also a vital road link to the sea, for many parts of eastern Democratic Republic of the Congo.

Points of interest
The following points of interest lie along or near the Kampala–Jinja Highway:
(1) Uganda Management Institute; in the Central Division of Kampala. (2) Makerere University Business School; which is located in Nakawa, Kampala. (3) Kyambogo University; in Kyambogo, Kampala. (4) Banda Hill; this is hill on which Kyambogo University is located. The name also refers  to the residential and commercial neighborhoods on and around that hill. (5) Kireka; is a  township located in Kira Municipality. (6) Bweyogerere; is another township in Kira Municipality. (7) Mandela National Stadium; is the largest sports stadium in Uganda, with a seating capacity of 45,202.

(8) Namilyango College; is an all-boys boarding high school which is located bout , south of the highway, at Seeta in Mukono Town. (9) Mukono Town; is the point where the Mukono–Kayunga–Njeru Road and the Mukono–Kyetume–Katosi–Nyenga Road branch off the Kampala–Jinja Highway. (11) Mount St Mary's College Namagunga; an all-girls boarding secondary school at Namagunga, Buikwe District. (12). Lugazi Town; located in Buikwe District, it is the headquarters of Sugar Corporation of Uganda Limited.

(13) University of Military Science and Technology; in Lugazi, is an institution of the Uganda People's Defence Force. (14) Mabira Forest; is a natural tropical rain forest in Central Uganda. (15) Njeru Town; is the largest town in Buikwe District. (16) Nalubaale Power Station; Uganda's oldest public hydropower station was commissioned in 1954. The highway passes over the dam. (17) Kiira Power Station; was commissioned in 2003. The highway passes within  of the dam and hydropower plant. (18) Nile Breweries Limited; is a subsidiary of Anheuser-Busch InBev. The highway passes next to the factory at Njeru.

See also

 Kampala Northern Bypass Highway
 List of roads in Uganda
 List of cities and towns in Uganda

References

External links
Mabira Forest covers over 300km²
Government Teams-up With World Bank To Build Over $1.5b Road Projects

Roads in Uganda
Kampala District
Wakiso District
Mukono District
Buikwe District
Jinja District